Muhammed Zbidat (born 15 November 1991) is an Arab-Israeli footballer who currently plays the defender position

References

1991 births
Living people
Israeli footballers
Arab-Israeli footballers
Arab citizens of Israel
Bnei Sakhnin F.C. players
Maccabi Netanya F.C. players
Hapoel Ramat Gan F.C. players
Shimshon Kafr Qasim F.C. players
Hapoel Iksal F.C. players
Israeli Premier League players
Liga Leumit players
Association football defenders
Footballers from Sakhnin